Mirampello was one of the 4 provinces in Lasithi Prefecture of Greece. Its territory corresponded with that of the current municipality Agios Nikolaos, except the village Exo Potamoi. It was abolished in 2006.

References

Provinces of Greece